A by-election was held for the New South Wales Legislative Assembly electorate of South Sydney on 13 February 1893 because of the resignation of James Toohey, in protest at the failure of the Protectionist Dibbs government to implement principles of protection.

Dates

Result

James Toohey resigned.

See also
Electoral results for the district of South Sydney
List of New South Wales state by-elections

Notes

References

1893 elections in Australia
New South Wales state by-elections
1890s in New South Wales